Barend Bonneveld (27 November 1887 – 9 February 1978) was a Dutch heavyweight wrestler. He competed at the 1912 Summer Olympics and the 1920 Summer Olympics in Greco-Roman wrestling.

References

External links
 

1887 births
1978 deaths
Olympic wrestlers of the Netherlands
Wrestlers at the 1912 Summer Olympics
Wrestlers at the 1920 Summer Olympics
Dutch male sport wrestlers
People from Diemen
Sportspeople from North Holland